The Cherokee Neosho Crawford League is a high school athletics conference comprising nine high school athletic teams in southeastern Kansas, eight public schools and one parochial Catholic school.

Member schools

References

High school sports conferences and leagues in the United States